Alexis Kossenko (born 1977 in Nice) is a  French contemporary flautist, conductor and musicologist.

Education 
Kossenko followed the courses of flautist Alain Marion at the Conservatoire National Supérieur de Paris, where he obtained a First Prize, as well as those of Marten Root at the Conservatorium van Amsterdam, which awarded him a soloist's degree.

Career

As flautist 

As conductor 
Alongside his career as a flautist, Kossenko developed conductor activities as guest conductor of ensembles B'Rock (Belgium), Holland Baroque Society (Netherlands), European Union Baroque Orchestra, Le Concert d'Astrée (France) and Arte dei Suonatori (Poland).

In 2010, Kossenko established the international ensemble of Baroque music on ancient instruments and of classical music Les Ambassadeurs.

In October 2019 he was named incoming Music Director of the French period instrument orchestra, Grande Écurie et la Chambre du Roy, to begin in 2020.

Discography

With the ensemble Arte dei Suonatori 
 Complete concertos by Carl Philipp Emanuel Bach (10 de Classica Répertoire, 5 étoiles de Goldberg, Choc du Monde de la Musique)(Alpha)
 Leçons de ténèbres by Marc-Antoine Charpentier with Stephan MacLeod (baritone) (Alpha)
 Concertos for flûte by Antonio Vivaldi (Editor's Choice de Gramophone) (Alpha)

With the orchestra Les Ambassadeurs 
 2013: Concerti per l'Orchestra di Dresda by Antonio Vivaldi (Alpha)
 2013: Le Grand Théâtre de l'Amour by Jean-Philippe Rameau with Sabine Devieilhe (soprano), Samuel Boden (tenor), Aimery Lefevre (baritone) and the Jeune Chœur de Paris (Erato)
 2014: Trio sonatas by Carl Philip Emanuel Bach (Alpha)
 2015: Operture & Concerti for Darmstadt by Telemann (Alpha)
 2021: Per l'Orchestra di Dresda by various composers (Johann David Heinichen, Jan Dismas Zelenka, Georg Philipp Telemann, Johann Joachim Quantz, Johann Georg Pisendel)

Bibliography 
Conversation with Alexis Kossenko, in Remy Campos, Le Conservatoire de Paris et son histoire, une institution en questions, Paris, L'Œil d'or, 2016,

References

External links 
 Les Ambassadeurs
 Alexis Kossenko on France Musique
 Alexis Kossenko et Les Ambassadeurs on FIP
 Alexis Kossenko on Outhere
 MOZART - Flute Concerto (1/3) K.314 in D major - Alexis Kossenko & Les Ambassadeurs on YouTube

French classical flautists
French male conductors (music)
Conservatoire de Paris alumni
1977 births
People from Nice
Living people
21st-century French conductors (music)
21st-century French male musicians
Erato Records artists
21st-century flautists